Aabsal (Ābsāl) is one of the major manufacturers of home appliances in Iran. Aabsal was established in 1956 and is listed on the Tehran Stock Exchange. The company manufactures air coolers, gas heaters, gas cookers and washing machines among other products.

Operations
Aabsal Co. engages in the manufacture and sale of automatic front loading washing machines, dishwashers, water evaporative air coolers, and room Gas heaters in Iran. The company serves customers through a network of sales representatives. Aabsal Co. was formerly known as Universal PLC. and changed its name in 1983.

While established in Tehran, Aabsal currently has 348 locations across Iran.

References

External links
 

Manufacturing companies established in 1956
Home appliance manufacturers of Iran
Manufacturing companies based in Tehran
Companies listed on the Tehran Stock Exchange
Conglomerate companies of Iran
Iranian brands
1956 establishments in Iran